Parliamentary elections were held in the Maldives on 22 January 2005. At the time of the elections political parties were banned, so all candidates ran as independents. Supporters of President Maumoon Abdul Gayoom emerged as the largest group in the People's Majlis.

Background
The elections were originally planned for 31 December 2004, but were postponed following the Indian Ocean earthquake and tsunami on 25 December which severely affected the islands.

Campaign
Whilst all 149 candidates ran as independents, their political affiliation were well known.

Conduct
Twenty opposition supporters were arrested on election day after recording election officials attempting to close a polling station whilst there were still voters waiting to cast their vote.

Results
Supporters of the Government emerged as the largest group in the People's Majlis, although the exact numbers were unclear; the opposition Maldivian Democratic Party claimed government supporters had won only 22 seats to their 18, whilst the government claimed to have 30 MPs and the MDP only eight.

The International Foundation for Electoral Systems and the Minivan Daily reported that pro-Government candidates won 20 seats.

Aftermath
Following the elections, political parties were legalised on 2 July 2005.

References

Elections in the Maldives
Maldives
Parliamentary election
Maldives
Election and referendum articles with incomplete results